María Peinado Bravo (born 8 February 1977 in Jaén) is a former Spanish athlete who specialized in the combined events. She holds Spanish records in the heptathlon and rarely contested women's decathlon.

Competition record

Personal bests
Outdoor
200 metres – 24.47 (+2.0) (Castellón 2002)
800 metres – 2:18.25 (Maribor 2008)
100 metres hurdles – 13.67 (+1.4) (Castellón 2002)
High jump – 1.71 (Logroño 2000)
Long jump – 6.22 (+1.0) (Kaunas 2001)
Shot put – 13.22 (Monzon 2006)
Javelin throw – 40.69 (Valencia 2002)
Heptathlon – 5860 (Castellón 2002) 
Decathlon – 6614 (Castellón 2005) 

Indoor
800 metres – 2:20.38 (Prague 2009)
60 metres hurdles – 8.60 (Madrid 2005)
High jump – 1.63 (Madrid 2005)
Long jump – 6.07 (Sevilla 2002)
Shot put – 13.34 (Turin 2009)
Pentathlon – 4352 (Seville 2002)

References

1977 births
Living people
Sportspeople from Jaén, Spain
Spanish heptathletes
Spanish female athletes
Athletes (track and field) at the 2005 Mediterranean Games
Mediterranean Games competitors for Spain